Drukyul or Druk Yul or variation, may refer to:

 Bhutan, an endonym meaning The Land of the Thunder Dragon in Bhutanese
 Drukyul, a historic name for Bhutan, see History of Bhutan
 Druk Yul, the Land of the Druk, the traditional lands of the Druk
 Druk Yul, the traditional territory ruled by the Druk Gyalpo
 HD 73534 b (planet), Star Gakyid, Constellation Cancer; an exoplanet named for Bhutan

See also

 Druk (disambiguation)
 Yul (disambiguation)